Tadd is a given name. Notable people with the name include:

Tadd Dameron (1917–1965), American jazz composer, arranger, and pianist
Tadd Fujikawa (born 1991), American golfer
Tadd Roosevelt (1879–1958), American heir and automobile worker

See also
Tad (given name)
Tedd (given name)